Yang Yin (楊愔) (511–560), courtesy name Zhunyan (遵彦), nickname Qinwang (秦王), was a high-level official of the Chinese Northern Qi dynasty.

Background

Service under Gao Huan and Gao Cheng

Service under Emperor Wenxuan

Service under Emperor Fei 

Northern Wei politicians
Northern Qi politicians
Chinese chancellors
511 births
560 deaths